A ginger snap is a biscuit flavoured with ginger.

Ginger Snaps may also refer to:
 "Ginger Snaps" (Dynasty), an episode of the television series Dynasty
 Ginger Snaps (film), a 2000 Canadian horror film
 GingerSnaps (novel), a 2008 novel by Cathy Cassidy
 Ginger Snaps (TV series), an American animated sitcom